Itola is a village in Vadodara district in the Indian state of Gujarat. It is 25 km away from the commercial centre of Vadodara in Gujarat state.

Demographics
 India census, Itola had a population of 3,600. Males constitute 51.83% of the population and females 48.17%. Itola has an average literacy rate of 80.59%: male literacy is 88.13%, and female literacy is 72.53%. In Itola, 10.83% of the population is under 6 years of age.

Transport

Railway
Itola railway station is located on the Western Railway Mumbai – Vadodara Segment. It is 52 km from Bharuch, 18 km from Vadodara.

Hindu Temples
Somnath Mahadev Temple

Sai Baba Temple

References

Villages in Vadodara district